Marine Serre (born December 13, 1991) is a French fashion designer who won the 2017 LVMH Prize for Young Fashion Designers.

Early life
Serre was born in Brive-la-Gaillarde nearby Corrèze, France. She studied in Marseille and after two years she moved to Belgium, to attend La Cambre, from where she graduated with high honours in 2016.

Career
Serre's graduation show "Radical Call For Love" in 2016 sparked the interest of international stores such as The Broken Arm and Dover Street Market. This collection debuted the crescent moon motif that has become a signature for her brand. After graduating from La Cambre, she held internships working under Sarah Burton at Alexander McQueen, Matthieu Blazy at Maison Margiela and Raf Simons at Dior. She worked in Paris for a year as a designer for Balenciaga while also working on her own line.

Serre made her runway debut in February 2018 in Paris. Her collections have been met with critical and commercial acclaim, and her brand is stocked internationally at Dover Street Market, Nordstrom, SSENSE, and more.  Her work focuses on innovation and sustainability, with a minimum of 50% of her collection consisting of upcycled material, such as old lace table cloths and vintage silk scarves.  In 2019 she became the first to collaborate with an air-filtration mask company to produce her branded air purifying masks.

References 

Living people
French fashion designers
French women fashion designers
1991 births